The June 2010 tornado outbreak may refer to the following tornado outbreaks:

 The tornado outbreak of June 5–6, 2010: An outbreak that produced 47 tornadoes across the Midwestern United States and the Lower Great Lakes on June 5–6, 2010, killing six in Ohio and one in Illinois
 The June 2010 Northern Plains tornado outbreak: An outbreak that produced over 60 reported tornadoes across the Northern Plains of the United States on June 17, 2010, killing at least three in Minnesota